The Whip is a 1917 American silent drama film directed by Maurice Tourneur that is based on the play of the same name by Henry Hamilton and Cecil Raleigh. The film stars Alma Hanlon, June Elvidge, and Irving Cummings. It also features Bobby Vernon, Wallace Beery, as well as Gloria Swanson in one of her early film roles. The film survives and has been released on DVD.

Plot
The movie tells the story of the training of a racehorse, the Whip, of the amnesiac nobleman who loves the horse, and of the villains who attempt to keep it from racing.

Cast
Alma Hanlon as Diana Beverley
June Elvidge as Mrs. D'Aquilia
Irving Cummings as Herbert Brancaster
Warren Cook as Judge Beverley
Paul McAllister as Baron Sartoris
Alfred Hemming as Joe Kelly
Dion Titheradge as Harry Anson
Jean Dumas as Myrtle Anson

Reception
Like many American films of the time, The Whip was subject to cuts by city and state film censorship boards. The Chicago Board of Censors required the flashing of three gambling scenes and cuts of the scene of a man disconnecting a brake and the intertitle "Our affair started on the boat. I was weak and yielded."

References

External sources
 
 
 The Whip at www.nuraypictures.com

1917 films
Silent American drama films
1917 drama films
American black-and-white films
American silent feature films
Films directed by Maurice Tourneur
1910s American films